La Belle Assiette is an online private chef booking platform, headquartered in Paris, France, that enables its users to browse and book menus and chefs. The service is available in 6 countries and has over 700 registered chefs. Co-founders Stephen Leguillon and Giorgio Riccò are the chief executive officer (CEO) and chief operations officer (COO), respectively.

History
La Belle Assiette was founded in 2012 in Paris, France, by entrepreneurs Stephen Leguillon and Giorgio Riccò after they met at ESCP Europe. After witnessing the success of platforms such as Airbnb and Uber, the founders saw an opportunity for a similar model within the restaurant sector. Via the La Belle Assiette platform, users can browse menus and book a desired chef. The chef then arrives at the customer's home with all the necessary ingredients and equipment to prepare the meal. Afterwards, the chef clears the table and cleans the kitchen.

Initially supported by a private business angel for a year, the startup then received backing from Bpifrance in 2012. In October 2014, La Belle Assiette raised 1.3 million euros in funding from the US and European business angels, bringing the total funding to 1.7 million euros. This allowed La Belle Assiette to open an office in London and pursue European expansion.

Features

Search
La Belle Assiette users search for menus prepared by locally available chefs by entering a postcode and the date of the booking. Results can be filtered by price, type of event (romantic, with friends etc.), cuisine (French, Italian etc.), occasion (Easter, Christmas etc.), cooking style (traditional, fusion etc.), dietary restrictions, and seasonality.

Chef profiles
Each chef has their own profile page featuring their menus, a brief biography, and customer reviews. Chefs can upload photos of their cooking to their gallery.

Menus
Users can browse menus by price, ranging from £39 (Temptation), £59 (Prestige), to £89+ (Signature). Prices are listed per person, with the cost decreasing the more guests there are.

Concierge
If a user needs help choosing a chef or has special requirements they can use the concierge service on the platform to deal directly with a La Belle Assiette member of staff. This allows users to organise events such as cooking classes, cocktail parties, buffets, and catering for holiday homes.

Chef business tools
La Belle Assiette attracts chefs to register with the service by not only offering promotion among users, but also by offering tools and advice for private chefs regarding billing and business practices.

International expansion
La Belle Assiette is present in France, Luxembourg, Belgium, Switzerland, Germany, and the United Kingdom, with plans to expand further in Europe during 2015.

Business model
La Belle Assiette receives 12% of the total cost of a booking, with the rest going to the chef to cover supplies and labour.

Reception
2012 - Won the Best E-commerce Innovation award from FEVAD and Journal du Net.

2013 - Awarded first place at the Grand Prix "Push Forward" Pitch Contest 2013, organised by FullSix Group and L'Express Ventures.

References

External links
Labelleassiette.co.uk
labelleassiette.fr

Online marketplaces of France
Chefs of French cuisine
Websites about food and drink